Bloco do Eu Sozinho is the second album by the Brazilian band Los Hermanos, released in 2001.

To escape the tension caused by the requirement for new hits from the record label, the band took refuge at a site in the mountainous region of Rio de Janeiro and began composing. During this period, bassist Patrick Laplan decided to depart from the group, apparently dissatisfied with the band's new sound. The producer and collaborator, Alexandre Kassin, replaced him while recording of the album. When the album was delivered to the label in April Music, it was rejected because there were no potential hits, and the production was considered amateurish. The April Music demanded that the album be remastered. In an agreement, the producer Marcelo Sussekind would remix the album. However, he liked the original version and produced an almost identical version, delivered to the record company.

The album had low sales compared to the previous one. This might be partially caused by the record company April Music not promoting the album very much for the lack of a potential big hit. Only a long tour managed to keep the band active, generating new fans and giving a certain "cult" status to the group.

Track listing

Personnel 
Marcelo Camelo – Vocals, Guitar
Rodrigo Amarante – Vocals, Guitar
Rodrigo Barba – Drums
Bruno Medina – Musical keyboard
Rafael Ramos – Producer

Additional musicians 

 Alexandre Kassin – Bass 
 Felipe Abrahão – Vocals on "Cher Antoine" and "Mais uma Canção"
 Daniel Garcia – Tenor Saxophone
 Eduardo Morelenbaum – Clarinet, Clarone
 Bidinho – Trumpet
 Bubu – Trumpet, Flugehorn
 Vitor Santos – Trombone
 Eliézer Rodrigues – Tuba 
 Lenna Beauty – Spanish Vocals on "Sentimental"

References

Los Hermanos albums
2001 albums